Shakti Arora (born 16 May 1986) is an Indian actor who primarily works in Hindi television. He is known for his predominantly performances in Tere Liye, Pavitra Rishta, Meri Aashiqui Tum Se Hi and Silsila Badalte Rishton Ka. Arora has also participated in dance reality shows like Nach Baliye 7 (2015) and Jhalak Dikhhla Jaa 9 (2016).

Career

Initial days and critical appreciation (2006–2014)

Arora made his television debut in 2006 with Ssshhhh...Phir Koi Hai and then played Kamran in Sony SAB's Left Right Left that year.

In 2007, he signed Star Plus's medical based series Dill Mill Gaye for the supporting role of Sumit.

After a 2-year break, he was back to television in 2009 as Jigar Thakkar in Baa Bahoo Aur Baby.

In 2010, he joined Star Plus's Tere Liye as Taposh Banerjee.

In 2011, he was roped in as Mukul in Zee TV's Agle Janam Mohe Bitiya Hi Kijo and as Angad Purohit in Sanskaar Laxmi.

Arora gained high appreciation for his performance as Onir Dutt, a doctor in Zee TV's one of the most popular soap operas, Pavitra Rishta, which he did from 2012 to 2013.

In 2012, he also hosted Gyaan Guru and Gumrah: End of Innocence.

His first show as a contestant came with Rasoi Ki Rani.

In 2013, he too hosted Science With BrainCafe and acted in Yeh Hai Aashiqui as Mayank opposite Kapoor and in MTV Webbed as Kavish Mehta apart from a special cameo in Star Plus's Yeh Hai Mohabbatein.

His first project of 2014 was as Avinash opposite Charlie Chauhan in Zing's Pyaar Tune Kya Kiya.

Establishment as a leading actor (2014–present)

Arora achieved his first leading role in June 2014, as Ranveer Vaghela, a successful business tycoon in Colors TV's Meri Aashiqui Tum Se Hi opposite Radhika Madan and later also played Ranveer's twin brother Milan Vaghela in it. He earned several awards and nomination for the show, before it ended in February 2016.

Simultaneously along with Meri Aashiqui Tum Se Hi, he also took part in the dance reality show Nach Baliye 7 in 2015.

Arora additionally gave guest appearances in Jhalak Dikhhla Jaa 7 and Krishnadasi as his character Ranveer Vaghela from Meri Aashiqui Tum Se Hi.

As himself he was a guest in Comedy Nights Bachao and narrated Colors TV's Kasam Tere Pyaar Ki.

In 2016, he contested in season 2 of Box Cricket League. That year he also participated in dance reality show Jhalak Dikhhla Jaa 8 as a contestant.

Then he hosted Man Mein Hai Visshwas 2.

In June 2018, Arora begun starring alongside Drashti Dhami and Aditi Dev Sharma in Colors TV's Silsila Badalte Rishton Ka as a pediatrician doctor, Kunal Malhotra. He quit the show in 2019.

He next appeared in Colors TV's cooking show Kitchen Champion 5.

In June 2022, he replaced Dheeraj Dhoopar as lead Karan Luthra in Zee TV's Kundali Bhagya. However, he quit the series in March 2023 owing to a generation leap in the show and to explore different projects.

Filmography

Television

Guest appearances

Films

Awards and nominations

See also 
 List of Indian television actors

References

External links

1986 births
Living people
Indian male television actors
Male actors in Hindi television
Male actors from Mumbai